"" ("The Violet"), K. 476, is a song for voice and piano by Wolfgang Amadeus Mozart, written in Vienna on 8 June 1785, to a poem by Johann Wolfgang von Goethe.

Lyrics
Goethe wrote the poem in 1773 or early 1774. It was first published in March 1775 in his first Singspiel Erwin und Elmire which was first set to music in 1775 by the German composer Johann André (a revival in 1776 used music by Anna Amalia of Brunswick-Wolfenbüttel and by Carl David Stegmann, and another 1785 had music by Ernst Wilhelm Wolf and Karl Christian Agthe).

In 1771, Goethe had written the poem "Heidenröslein" which tells of a young man's plucking of a feisty rose. In "Das Veilchen" it is a careless girl who destroys a violet, a metaphor for a young man's heart.

Music
This song is Mozart's only setting to a text by Goethe. It not clear where exactly Mozart encountered the poem, but is likely through one of its settings by other composers of the time. Mozart made a telling addition by adding his last line.

The poem is written in three stanzas, but instead of using strophic form, Mozart creates a through-composed work, demonstrating his careful attention to the words of the poet by creating a different mood for each verse. At the end of the song, the composer recalls the opening line in a touching 5-bar coda.

The piece is 65 bars long and a performance lasts about  minutes. Its key signature is G major; its meter is 2/4. The vocal range covers only the interval of a ninth, from F4 to G5.

The piece starts with a 6-bar introduction of the melody of the first line by the piano. The first stanza takes up the next 15 bars. The entry of the shepherdess is marked by a modulation to D major; this is followed by a four-bar segment which summarises the violet's happy mood – and a general pause which precedes the mood swing of the second verse, a change of key to G minor to describe the violet's longing. There is a modulation to the relative major B-flat major in the latter part of that verse when the violet expresses hope of being loved back, but ending in a falling phrygian lament. The narration of the third verse is a recitativo accompagnato in E-flat major culminating in the trampling of the violet which is emphasised by a following general pause. The dying flower is described by a chromatically falling line, before the final modulation back to G major changes the pain into jubilation: to die at the beloved's feet. Then Mozart adds two phrases of his own as a coda; in recitative, in free time and using only two notes: "Das arme Veilchen!" (Poor little violet!), a long general pause, and closing the song a tempo with a quotation from the third line: "es war ein herzigs Veilchen." (it was the sweetest violet.)

By other composers
Other composers who have set this poem to music (besides those mentioned above as composers of Goethe's singspiel) include Philipp Christoph Kayser (1776), Anton Schweitzer (1777), Joseph Anton Steffan (1779), Johann Friedrich Reichardt in 1780 and in 1783, (the second setting was praised by Clara Kathleen Rogers and Felix Mendelssohn) Karl Siegmund von Seckendorff (1779), Friedrich Heinrich Himmel (c. 1807), Peter Josef von Lindpaintner (1815), Václav Tomášek (1815), Carl Gottlieb Reissiger (1827), Clara Schumann (1853), Nikolai Medtner (1909), and Othmar Schoeck (1915). Musical settings in other languages include the composers Halfdan Kjerulf to a Danish translation by Adam Oehlenschläger,  to a Swedish text, and an English version by Clara Kathleen Rogers.

References

External links

Mozart: "Das Veilchen“ – im Kontext verschiedener Vertonungen, Hubert Wißkirchen, 25 May 2011 
"Das Veilchen", translations, list of musical settings, at the LiederNet Archive
, Kathleen Battle, 1990

Musical settings of poems by Johann Wolfgang von Goethe
1785 compositions
1785 songs
Compositions by Wolfgang Amadeus Mozart
Compositions in G major
Stefan Zweig Collection